Michael Mavroudis was a martyr from Granitsa, who died in 1544.

External links
 Granitsa Evrytanias (in Greek)

16th-century Christian martyrs
1544 deaths
Year of birth unknown